J. Richard Davis (1905 – December 30, 1969), also known as Dixie Davis, was the lawyer for mobster Dutch Schultz.

Biography
Davis was born in New York City in 1905 and grew up in Tannersville, New York after his father, a tailor named Davidowitz, relocated the family to the Catskills. Davis attended Syracuse University Law School and was admitted to the New York State Bar in 1927. He served a clerkship, and then started his own firm in New York City specializing in defending mobsters.

Many of Davis' clients were African-Americans involved in the numbers game in Harlem. In 1932 he decided that he could take control and brought in Dutch Schultz as enforcer only to lose control to Schultz.

With the murder of Schultz in 1935, Davis took over his numbers racket. On July 14, 1937 a grand jury indicted Davis for racketeering. In exchange for his cooperation, Davis was sentenced to one year in prison and was disbarred.

On December 30, 1969, Dixie Davis died of a heart attack in his home in Bel-Air, California during a break-in. Two masked gunmen had bound his wife and grandson and had stolen jewels, furs and cash.

The character Tommy Farrell in the 1958 film Party Girl is loosely based on him.

References

1905 births
1970 deaths
Syracuse University College of Law alumni
20th-century American lawyers